Long Island School for the Gifted (LISG) is a private school (pre-kindergarten to 9th grade) for gifted children located in Huntington Station, New York in Suffolk County.

School history
Long Island School for the Gifted was founded in 1980 by Carol Yilmaz. Her mission was to bring more advanced education to students who felt like they were not being challenged enough in school. Along with other members known as the "founding mommies", LISG was a reality. It did not reside at 165 Pidgeon Hill Road until the start of the 1984 school year. Since then, LISG has become one of the most advanced schools on Long Island, where alumni have gone to Ivy League colleges and have won numerous awards .

Student acceptance and life
In order to be accepted into LISG, students must take an IQ test and have a score of over 130. LISG admits students of any race, sex, and ethnicity. Students at LISG will learn at least one to three grades above grade level in their respected subjects. They offer regents for students and the SAT is taken by 7th graders for enrollment in the Center for Talented Youth Talent Search. Student class sizes are around 12-16 people forming an easier class chemistry with the teachers and students. There are currently 46 staff members, teachers, and administrators.

School setup
LISG is divided into three levels:

 Lower School: Kindergarten - 3rd Grade
 Middle School: 4th Grade - 6th Grade
 Upper School: 7th Grade - 9th Grade

The building itself has three wings, with classrooms; offices; an auditorium; two gymnasiums (One Small, One Big); a cafeteria; and a field with a playground, a baseball field, and tennis courts.

Enrollment
The total number of students is approximately 230 as of the 2016/2017 school year.

Staff
There are currently 46 staff members, teachers, and administrators. Patricia Geyer is the current Head of School after Roberta Tropper's retirement at the end of the 2015–2016 school year.

Tuition
Tuition varies from year to year. To see the most recent tuition rates, please follow this link

Notable alumni
Hoodie Allen (rapper)

References

External links

Schools in Suffolk County, New York
Private middle schools in New York (state)
Private elementary schools in New York (state)